Lamontichthys stibaros is a species of armored catfish endemic to Ecuador where it occurs in the Bobonaza River basin in the Andes.  This species grows to a length of  SL.

References 
 

Harttiini
Catfish of South America
Freshwater fish of Ecuador
Fish of the Andes
Taxa named by Isaäc J. H. Isbrücker
Taxa named by Han Nijssen
Fish described in 1978